West Virginia Route 100 is a north–south state highway located entirely within Monongalia County, West Virginia. The southern terminus of the route is at U.S. Route 19 in Westover, located on the opposite (west) bank of the Monongahela River of Morgantown. The northern terminus is at US 19 five miles (8 km) northwest of Maidsville.

History
WV 100 was the prior route of US 19 prior to the construction of the Star City Bridge over the Monongahela River, which crosses over WV 100 about 1/3 of the way from its southern terminus, in about 1950.  Prior to that time, there was no river crossing into Morgantown other than the Westover Bridge.

Major intersections

References

100
Transportation in Monongalia County, West Virginia